Jim Piaskoski (born October 10, 1948) is a former professional Canadian football defensive end who played twelve seasons in the Canadian Football League for the Ottawa Rough Riders.

References

Living people
Canadian football defensive linemen
Canadian players of American football
Eastern Michigan Eagles football players
Eastern Michigan University alumni
Ottawa Rough Riders players
Players of Canadian football from Ontario
Sportspeople from Greater Sudbury
1948 births